Léon Séché (3 April 1848 - 5 May 1914) was a French poet.

Biography
Léon Séché was born in Ancenis. He died in Nice.

Works 
 Les griffes du lion (1871)
 Rose Epoudry, Roman, 1881.
 La Chanson de la vie, poésies. Couronné par l’Académie Française, Didier, 1889.
 Les derniers jansénistes, depuis la ruine de Port-Royal jusqu'à nos jours, 3 tomes, 1891, Couronné par l’Académie française.
 Les origines du concordat (1894)
 Éducateurs et moralistes, Delagrave, 1895.
 Jules Simon, 1814-1896, Figures bretonnes, E. Lechevalier, 1898.
 Port Royal des Champs, Petit manuel du pèlerin, suivi par Racine au Port-Royal, L Chevalier, 1899.
 Les œuvres poétiques de Jacques Pelletier du Mans, Revue de la Renaissance, 1904.
 Honoré de Balzac et ses démêlés avec Sainte-Beuve à propos de Port-Royal, Le Mercure de France, Paris, 1904.
 Revue de la Renaissance, organe interne des amis du XVIe et de la Pléiade, paraissant sous la direction de Léon Séché. Couronné par l’Académie française.
 Le Petit Lyré de Joachim du Bellay, Didier, 1879. 
 Contes et Figures de mon pays, Dentu, 1881.
 Œuvres choisies de Joachim du Bellay, Ed. du Monument, 1894.
 En collaboration, La Fête de Joachim du Bellay à Ancenis, 2 septembre 1894,  P., Librairie historique des Provinces, 1894.
 Joachim du Bellay et la Bretagne angevine (Recherches sur la Pléiade, I), illustrations de Jacques Pohier, P. Lechevalier, 1900.
 Joachim du Bellay, La défense de la langue française, Préface de Léon Séché, 1904.
 Alfred de Vigny, couronné par l’Académie française, F. Juven, 1902.
 Sainte-Beuve, son esprit, ses idées, ses mœurs, Mercure de France, 1904.
 Correspondance inédite de Sainte-Beuve avec M.et Mme Juste Olivier, Mercure de France, 1904. 
 Lamartine, de 1816 à 1830. Elvire et les Méditations, Mercure de France, 1905.
 Victor Hugo et les Poètes I, Le Cénacle de Joseph Delorme, Mercure de France, 1906.
 Alfred de Vigny I, La vie littéraire, Mercure de France, 1906.
 Alfred de Musset I L’homme et l’œuvre, les camarades (documents inédits),  Mercure de France, 1907.
 Alfred de Musset II Les Femmes, Mercure de France, 1907.
 Correspondance d’Alfred de Musset, 1827-1857, Mercure de France, 1907.
 Lettres inédites d’Hortense Allart de Méritens à Sainte-Beuve, Muses romantiques,  Mercure de France, 1908.
 Hortense Allart de Méritens, dans ses rapports avec Chateaubriand, Béranger, Lamennais,Sainte-Beuve, G.Sand et Mme d’Agoult, Muses romantiques, Mercure de France, 1908.
 Mme d’Arbouville, d’après sa correspondance  avec Sainte-Beuve, Mercure de France, 1909.
 Le Roman de Lamartine, Fayard, 1909.
 Le Cénacle de la Muse française, 1823-1827, Mercure de France, 1909.
 Victor Hugo et les Artistes II, Le Cénacle de Joseph Delorme, Mercure de France, 1910.
 Lettres d’amour d’Alfred de Musset à Aimée d’Alton, Mercure de France, 1910.
 Delphine Gray (Mme Girardin) dans ses rapports avec Lamartine, Victor Hugo, Balzac, Rachel, Jules Sandeau, Dumas, Eugène Sue et G.Sand, Muses romantiques,  Mercure de France, 1910.
 La jeunesse dorée sous Louis Philippe, Mercure de France, 1910.
 Les Amitiés de Lamartine, Mercure de France, 1911.
 Alfred de Vigny II La vie amoureuse, Mercure de France, 1913.

External links

 Former monument to Léon Séché in Ancemis

19th-century French writers
20th-century French non-fiction writers
French male writers
1848 births
1914 deaths